Yoshio Kojima (7 August 1931 – 3 March 1993) was a Japanese hammer thrower who competed in the 1956 Summer Olympics. He committed suicide in 1993 in Kobe.

References

1931 births
1993 suicides
Japanese male hammer throwers
Japanese male shot putters
Olympic male hammer throwers
Olympic athletes of Japan
Athletes (track and field) at the 1956 Summer Olympics
Asian Games gold medalists for Japan
Asian Games silver medalists for Japan
Asian Games gold medalists in athletics (track and field)
Asian Games medalists in athletics (track and field)
Athletes (track and field) at the 1954 Asian Games
Medalists at the 1954 Asian Games
Japan Championships in Athletics winners
Suicides in Japan
Sportspeople from Kobe
20th-century Japanese people